Athrips zophochalca is a moth of the family Gelechiidae. It is found in New Zealand.

The wingspan is about 9 mm. The forewings are glossy rather dark bronzy-fuscous. The stigmata are blackish, the plical obliquely before the first discal. There are small cloudy whitish spots on the costa before three-fourths and on the tornus slightly anterior to this. The hindwings are dark fuscous with a fine longitudinal hyaline line in the disc.

References

Moths described in 1918
Athrips
Moths of New Zealand